Hernán Gastón Peirone (born 28 May 1986 in Villa del Rosario, Córdoba) is an Argentine football striker who plays for Argentine amateur club Luque.

Peirone has played for San Lorenzo since he came through the youth system in 2003.

Peirone has not played any first team games for San Lorenzo since 2006, he had the opportunity to sign on loan for Racing Club de Avellaneda in August 2008, but he did not sign his contract.

In 2009, he signed for the Ecuadorian Club Emelec. At his arrival in Ecuador he immediately became a solution for Emelec's scoring problems and scored some goals in both the Copa Sudamericana and the Ecuadorian championship. However, Emelec could not qualify for the final of the Ecuadorian championship and was eliminated in the second round of Copa Sudamericana.

Peirone's performances did not fully satisfy  Emelec's fans expectations and he was considered one of the players to be released from the club for the 2010 season. Despite this he was given a vote of confidence by both the team's administrators and the manager and he remains in Emelec for another season.

International career
Peirone has played for the Argentina under-17 and under-20 squads. He was the top scorer (5 goals) of the 2003 South American Under-17 Football Championship.

Titles

External links
 Argentine Primera statistics
 BDFA profile

References

1986 births
Living people
Argentine footballers
Argentine expatriate footballers
Argentina youth international footballers
Sportspeople from Córdoba Province, Argentina
Association football forwards
San Lorenzo de Almagro footballers
C.S. Emelec footballers
San Luis de Quillota footballers
Unión Temuco footballers
Club Alianza Lima footballers
Estudiantes de Río Cuarto footballers
Unión San Felipe footballers
Unión de Sunchales footballers
Racing de Córdoba footballers
Deportivo Español footballers
Argentine Primera División players
Ecuadorian Serie A players
Chilean Primera División players
Primera B de Chile players
Peruvian Primera División players
Argentine expatriate sportspeople in Ecuador
Argentine expatriate sportspeople in Chile
Argentine expatriate sportspeople in Peru
Expatriate footballers in Ecuador
Expatriate footballers in Chile
Expatriate footballers in Peru